"What I Mean" is a song by French house duo Modjo. It was released in September 2001 as the third single from their debut album, Modjo (2001). There are two versions, the original mix and another more dance-oriented.

Track listing
 CD single – Europe (2001)
 "What I Mean" (Original album mix)
 "What I Mean" (Aloud mix)

Charts

References

2001 singles
Modjo songs
2001 songs